Hakim Habibur Rahman
(23 March 188123 February 1947) was an Unani physician, litterateur, journalist, politician and chronicler in early 20th-century Dhaka, British India (now Bangladesh).

Rahman was a close associate of Nawab Sir Khwaja Salimullah of the Dhaka Nawab Family. His two chronicles of Dhaka, Asudegan-e-Dhaka and Dhaka Panchas Baras Pahle, remain important primary source material for researchers working on Dhaka. His wide collection of manuscripts, coins, weapons and artefacts is preserved at the Dhaka University Library as the Hakim Habibur Rahman Collection. The Hakim Habibur Rahman Lane carries his name near his birthplace, the Choto Katra, a landmark in the old part of Dhaka.

Medical career
Habibur Rahman trained for 11 years in tibb (traditional medical practice) and the Unani system of medicine at Kanpur, Lucknow, Delhi and Agra after completing his studies at Dhaka Madrasah. He established his own practice in 1904. In 1939 he was awarded the title of Shifaul Mulk for his contribution in the field of Unani medicine by the British government.

Social and political work
Habibur Rahman was a prominent leader of the Khilafat Movement in East Bengal. In the 1920s and '30s he performed as a major arbitrator for the Sardar community of Dhaka, who were the traditional leaders of the Panchayet system of local government of Dhaka. He edited Al Mushriq, an Urdu monthly journal, in 1906, and launched another Urdu monthly, Jadu, together with Khwaja Adel in 1924. He founded the Tibbia Habibia College in Dhaka in 1930. Apart from his general support to the Dhaka Museum, he donated 231 old coins, some of gold and silver, to the museum in 1936.

Tibbia Habibia College is the one of oldest medical colleges and the oldest Unani medical college in Bangladesh. This was not only a college, it was the pioneer of Unani medicine revolution in Bangladesh. Hakim Habibur Rahman is still remembered and respected for this establishment. Tibbia Habibia College has been producing Unani physician with the title DUMS (Diploma in Unani Medicine and Surgery). It has designed and formed a Unani medical college under Dhaka University which has been producing BUMS (Bachelor of Unani Medicine and Surgery) physician for the country.

Literary work
A notable Urdu journalist and writer in turn of the century Dhaka, Habibur Rahman wrote extensively, often under the takhallus (pen name) of Ahsan (meaning "mercy"). Apart from the celebrated Asudegan-e-Dhaka (1946) and Dhaka Panchas Baras Pahle (1949), his other major works include Al-Fariq (1904), Socrates' biography Hayat-e-Sukrat (1904), Tazkiratul-Fujala and Masajid-e-Dhaka. He collected all the Arabic, Persian and Urdu books written in Bengal for more than 40 years and published a catalogue titled Sulasa Ghusala. He compiled the correspondence of Mirza Ghalib and Khwaja Haider Jan Shayek, a 19th-century Urdu poet from Dhaka, in Inshaye Shayek. He was the founder secretary of Anjuman-e-Urdu, an organisation established to provide a forum for Urdu in East Bengal and Assam.

Hakim Habibur Rahman Foundation
The Hakim Habibur Rahman Foundation was established in 1994 in his memory. The scope of the foundation includes research on and promotion of herbal and Unani medicine, establishment of charitable institutions on traditional medical studies and exchange of knowledge, awards of merit, organisation of seminars and symposia, and promotion of Rahman's social and intellectual ideals. Hakim Syed Zillur Rahman from India is one of the recipients of the Foundation 'awards of merit' in 1996.

References

Further reading

 

1881 births
1947 deaths
20th-century Indian medical doctors
Unani practitioners
Physicians from Dhaka
Medical doctors in British India
Writers in British India